Chris Schuler (born September 6, 1987) is an American former soccer player who last played for Orlando City in Major League Soccer. He is currently pursuing an events management career with US Soccer.

Career

College and amateur
Schuler attended college at Creighton University. During his time there he won awards such as MVP at the US Youth Soccer National Championships in July 2006, Missouri Valley Conference Defensive Player of the Year, NSCAA Second-Team All-America and NSCAA All-Midwest Region First-Team.

During his college years Schuler also played for Chicago Fire Premier in the USL Premier Development League.

Professional
Schuler was drafted in the third round (39th overall) of the 2010 MLS SuperDraft by Real Salt Lake.

He made his professional debut on June 2, 2010, in a Lamar Hunt U.S. Open Cup game against D.C. United. Schuler joined USSF Division 2 club AC St. Louis on July 20, 2010 for a four game loan deal, returning to Salt Lake before the end of the 2010 MLS season.

Schuler scored his first professional goal on April 9, 2011, in a game against the New England Revolution.

On November 8, 2013, Schuler scored what proved to be the series winner for RSL during the second leg of the 2013 Western Conference Semifinals versus the LA Galaxy, making the aggregate 2-1.

Once a promising player, Schuler could never stay healthy enough after 2014 to contribute enough to justify a role with the club. Real Salt Lake opted out of renewing Chris Schuler's contract as of November 30, 2015.

Following his release from Salt Lake at the end of the 2017 season, Schuler signed with Orlando City on March 2, 2018. He scored his first goal for the club, and his first in four years, in a 2-1 win against Toronto FC to help end a nine-game losing streak. At the end of the season the club announced they had declined his contract option.

Career statistics

Club

References

External links
 

1988 births
Living people
AC St. Louis players
American soccer players
Association football midfielders
Chicago Fire U-23 players
Creighton Bluejays men's soccer players
Creighton University alumni
Major League Soccer players
Orlando City SC players
Real Monarchs players
Real Salt Lake draft picks
Real Salt Lake players
Soccer players from Illinois
Soccer players from St. Louis
Sportspeople from Aurora, Illinois
USL Championship players
USL League Two players
USSF Division 2 Professional League players